is a 2023Japanese superhero kaiju tokusatsu film and a direct sequel to Ultraman Decker TV series. The fourth theatrical Ultraman film in the Reiwa era, it tells the story of the struggling fight of GUTS-Select with evil Professor Gibellus, while a mysterious woman, who can transform into Ultraman Dinas, appears to help them.

The film was released both theatrically and on the streaming services on February 23, 2023.

Plot 

When a mysterious sound causes several disappearances, GUTS-Select decide to investigate the unexplained incidents. However, they soon learn it is the work of evil Professor Gibellus, who intends to invade the Earth with his alien army. Fortunately, a mysterious woman with a power of Ultraman appears just in time to help worried members of GUTS-Select.

Production 
The movie is directed by Masayoshi Takesue, who also was the director of Ultraman Decker, Ultraman Trigger: Episode Z and several episodes of Ultraman Trigger: New Generation Tiga, while Toshizo Nemoto who also participated in the mentioned works was the movie's writer. The film's theme song, "Sora no Kanata e", was performed by Hironobu Kageyama.

Release 
In Japan, the film was released in theaters and on Tsuburaya Imagination simultaneously on February 23, 2023. The exclusive message from HANE2 and the show's 10 minutes long recap was shown in theaters before the movie's screening.

Worldwide, except for Japan and China, it was available to stream on Ultraman Connection the same day.

Marketing 
Ultraman Decker Finale: Journey to Beyond was first announced on November 26, 2022, with the first trailer releasing the same day. The same day, Japanese and English promotional posters were show. The second trailer was released on January 21, 2023, while name of the mysterious new Ultraman who is set to appear in the film was revealed to be Ultraman Dinas.

Cast 
/: 
: 
: 
: 
: 
/: 
: 
: 
: 
HANE2 (Voice): 
: 
: 
: 
: HIRO
: 
: 
: 
: 
: 
:

Theme song 

Arrangement: NANA KAGEYAMA
Lyrics, Composition, & Artist:

References 

2023 films
Ultra Series films
2020s superhero films
2020s Japanese superhero films
Kaiju films
Giant monster films
Alien invasions in films
2023 action drama films
2023 science fiction films
2023 action films
2020s Japanese-language films